Rabbi Menachem Froman (also spelled Menahem and Fruman; ‎; 1 June 1945 – 4 March 2013) was an Israeli Orthodox rabbi, and a peacemaker and negotiator with close ties to Palestinian religious leaders. A founding member of Gush Emunim, he served as the chief rabbi of Tekoa in the West Bank. He was well known for promoting and leading interfaith dialogue between Jews and Arabs, focusing on using religion as a tool and source for recognizing the humanity and dignity of all people. Together with a Palestinian journalist close to Hamas, Rabbi Froman drafted a ceasefire agreement between Israel and the Hamas government in the Gaza Strip, known as the Froman-Amayreh Agreement. The agreement was endorsed by Hamas government, but it did not receive any official response from the Israeli government.

Career 
Froman, a former Israeli paratrooper who took part in the 1967 capture of the Western Wall, was a student at the Mercaz haRav and Yeshivat HaKotel yeshivas. He was among the founders of the Gush Emunim settlement movement, and supported the establishment of Jewish settlements in the West Bank and Gaza Strip. He obtained rabbinical ordination from Rabbis Shlomo Goren and Avraham Shapira, and then became the rabbi of Migdal Oz, a settlement in the Gush Etzion area. He was Chief Rabbi of the Knesset. He taught at several yeshivas, including Ateret Cohanim and Machon Meir, and was a lecturer at the Tekoa Yeshiva and Otniel hesder Yeshiva.

Views and ideologies

Interfaith meetings and dialogue 
Rabbi Froman was involved in interfaith dialogue with Palestinians and Muslims, and participated in informal negotiations with many Palestinian leaders as he argued that peacemaking efforts between Israelis and Palestinians must include the religious sectors of both societies. Rabbi Froman conducted meetings with controversial Palestinian leaders, including with the late PLO Chairman and President of Palestinian National Authority Yasser Arafat, and the Hamas leaders Sheikh Ahmad Yassin and Mahmoud Al-Zahar. Rabbi Froman had close ties with Palestinian leaders, as evidenced by a letter he sent to Palestinian President Mahmoud Abbas about his last conversation with Yasser Arafat:

After the election of the Hamas government in the Gaza Strip, Rabbi Froman stepped up his efforts to organize meetings between Israeli and Palestinian religious leaders. He met and conducted negotiations with current Hamas leader Mahmoud al-Zahar and Hamas's Minister for Jerusalem Affairs, Sheikh Mahmoud Abu Tir, with the goal of drafting a ceasefire agreement that will end the killings in Gaza and the West Bank and lift the blockade imposed by Israel on the Gaza Strip.

Froman–Amayreh Agreement (2008) 
In February 2008, Rabbi Froman reached an agreement proposal with Khaled Amayreh, a journalist close to Hamas, for an Israeli-Hamas ceasefire in the Gaza Strip that would put an immediate end to all Palestinian attacks against Israeli civilians or soldiers, facilitate the release of abducted Israeli soldier Gilad Shalit, and end the Israeli siege of the Gaza Strip. Senior Hamas officials have endorsed the agreement proposal. The Israeli government, however, has not responded to this initiative, effectively rejecting it.

Froman drafted the agreement proposal with Amayreh after meeting with him over the course of several months. The paper was finalized and shown to Hamas leaders in Gaza and Hamas leader-in-exile Khaled Meshal who approved of it (see External links section). The agreement proposal was also submitted to the Israeli government but according to Rabbi Froman, the Israeli government never responded to it. The efforts of Rabbi Froman and Amayreh to meet with Israeli government officials were rebuffed.

The agreement proposal called for Israel to lift economic sanctions imposed on the Gaza Strip and open all border crossings. The cease-fire agreement included the release of abducted Israeli soldier Gilad Shalit, and a gradual release of Palestinian prisoners. The Israel Defense Forces would end "all hostile activities toward the Gaza Strip, including targeted killings, the setting of ambushes, aerial bombardments and all penetrations into Gazan territory, in addition to ending the arrest, detention and persecution of Palestinians in the Strip."

The Palestinians would be obligated "to take all the necessary steps to completely end the attacks against Israel," including stopping "indefinitely all rocket attacks on Israel," assaults "on Israeli civilians and soldiers" and "to impose a cease-fire on all groups, factions, and individuals operating in the Strip."

Along with Amayreh, Rabbi Froman said that even if the attempt turned out to be merely an academic exercise, its elements could be used by the Jerusalem and Gaza governments. It does not, for example, include the recognition by Hamas of the State of Israel, instead "recognizing that there are Jews living in the Holy Land," according to Froman, thus overcoming an obstacle that has long been a deal-breaker.

The importance of religion in the peace process 
Rabbi Froman lamented the early 21st century violence in Israel and the Palestinian Territories, and laid partial blame for the failure of the Oslo Accords on the tendency of Israeli and Palestinian secular negotiators to ignore and marginalize religion and religious leaders in the peace process:

Jerusalem – a shared capital 
Rabbi Froman supported making Jerusalem (the capital of Israel, also claimed by the Palestinians as their capital) the religious capital of all three monotheistic faiths. In November 1999, he participated in a conference with dozens of international religious leaders, including the Dalai Lama. In his 2005 letter to Palestinian President Mahmoud Abbas, Froman cited examples from Jewish tradition of the importance of sharing Jerusalem between all 3 religions and turning it into a city of peace:

Coexistence under Palestinian sovereignty 
Rabbi Froman opposed the forced eviction of Jewish settlers from their homes in the settlements in the West Bank, and advocated that the State of Israel withdraw from the West Bank and Gaza, yet leave the settlements and Israeli/Jewish residents in place under Palestinian sovereignty. He claimed that, if Israel withdraws from Tekoa and most residents leave, he will nonetheless stay because of his love of the Land of Israel:

He was a strong opponent of Israel's unilateral disengagement from Gaza. In August 2005, prior to the implementation of the disengagement plan, he moved with his family to Ganei Tal in Gush Katif in order to show support for the residents being evicted.

Rabbi Froman supported the Palestinian Authority's efforts to attain statehood recognition at the United Nations on 20 September 2011, and said that the establishment of the Palestinian state will benefit the peace process and Israel.

Personal 
Rabbi Froman was born in 1945 in Galilee, Mandate Palestine. He was married to educator and artist Hadassah Froman, and the couple had 10 children.

Upon being diagnosed with colorectal cancer in 2010, Rabbi Froman declared that he would add "Hai Shalom" (living peace) to his last name and re-dedicate his life to peace and coexistence between Jews and Arabs in Israel. Despite treatment by both conventional and natural means, he died on the evening of 4 March 2013, at the age of 67. His funeral in Tekoa on 5 March 2013, lasting 4 hours, was filled with music and poetry, and was attended by thousands of people of all political and religious ideologies.

References

External links
video of signing of Froman-Amayreh Accord
Profile by Jerusalem Peacemakers
Tekoa website
Interview in Holy Land documentary

1945 births
2013 deaths
Deaths from cancer in Israel
Deaths from colorectal cancer
Israeli activists
Israeli Orthodox Jews
Israeli Orthodox rabbis
Mercaz HaRav alumni
Israeli settlers
Jewish activists
Religious Zionist Orthodox rabbis
People from Haifa District